The St. Peter and St. Paul's Church is a Roman Catholic church in Panevėžys, Lithuania. The current Neo-Renaissance brick church was built between 1877 – 1885, however the parish dates to 1507 when the first church in Panevėžys was built on the right bank of Nevėžis and a filial church of the Panevėžys Old Town was established, belonging to the  Parish of Ramygala. It has an authentic organ constructed by Juozapas Radavičius which dates to 1887. The church was renewed in 2018 and a new altar, made of Greek marble and gilded wood carvings, was added and consecrated.

Gallery

References

Roman Catholic churches in Panevėžys
Roman Catholic churches completed in 1885
19th-century Roman Catholic church buildings in Lithuania
Romanesque Revival architecture in Lithuania
1885 establishments in the Russian Empire
Romanesque Revival church buildings